We Hate All Kinds of Violence... is the debut studio album by South Korean boy group H.O.T., released through SM Entertainment on September 7, 1996. Two singles were promoted off of the record—"Warrior's Descendant" and "Candy". It experienced commercially success upon its release with sales of over 1,500,000 copies, held the record as the best-selling album by an SM Entertainment artists for 24 years until the record was broken in 2020 by NCT's second studio album NCT 2020 Resonance Pt.1.

Background 
In early 1996, SM Entertainment founder and record producer Lee Soo-man surveyed high school students in the area to find out what their ideal pop music group would be like. Lee then used this information to form and create the concept of the agency's upcoming boy group, H.O.T. Five members—Moon Hee-joon, Jang Woo-hyuk, Tony An, Kangta and Lee Jae-won were recruited by the company and soon became trainees under the agency, a model that took inspiration from the idol system in Japan. The group made their debut with We Hate All Kinds of Violence on September 7, 1996.

Two singles were spawned from the album with accompanying music videos: the first single "Warrior's Descendant" is a critique of schoolyard bullying, while the second single, "Candy," is a cheerful bubblegum pop song that established the group's popularity in South Korea.

Composition and themes
Wi Su-ji of IZM wrote how the composition of the record's tracks caters to the needs of teenagers. The first track, "Candy", which was decided as a follow-up song after "Warrior's Descendant", contains lyrics about a love story with teenagers being able to relate to the lyrics in some way. In the rap part of "Warrior's Descendant", the group declares the opposition of all forms of violence; Yoo Young-jin who composed the track revealed that school violence, which was a big social problem at the time, inspired the artwork for the album's cover. At the time, the song was noted by critics for openly exposing problems of reality among the youth. The lyrics of the track "X Generation" revolve around the theme of emphasizing individuality rather than simply following trends.

Reception

Commercial performance
Upon its release, We Hate All Kinds of Violence was met with commercial success in South Korea, selling over 1.5 million copies and became one of the best-selling albums in the country. "Candy" topped the domestic music program rankings for multiple weeks.

Legacy

Pop culture commentators have regarded We Hate All Kinds of Violence for its role in ushering the modern idol system in K-pop. The trainee system laid by SM Entertainment with H.O.T. led them to become considered as the first idol group in South Korea; the fashion, rap skills and dance moves shown through its songs such as "Candy" sparked a new wave of mainstream music in the country.

In popular culture
The 2012 drama Reply 1997 revolves around the main character (played by Jung Eun-ji) idolizing H.O.T along with her friends in 1997, with one scene showing the characters attending a performance of "Warrior's Descendant". The show's popularity sparked a "retro" trend in South Korea with the media and cultural commentators noting an increased interest in 1990s pop culture following the drama's release.

Tracklist

Credits and personnel

 H.O.T.
 Kangta – lead vocals, chorus
 Jang Woo-hyuk – rap, chorus
 Tony Ahn – rap, English rap, vocals, chorus
 Lee Jae-won – rap, chorus
 Moon Hee-joon – rap, vocals, chorus
 Lee Tae-yoon – bass guitar (3)
 Son Jin-tae (3, 5)
 Kim Joo-hyun – others (4, 6, 8, 9)
 Lee Soo-man – executive producer

 Yoo Young-jin – director, chorus
 KAT (Heo Jeong-hee) – mixing, recording, chorus
 Jung Young-doo – recording, assistive technology
 R&C Communications – design
 Jung Hae-chan – illustrator
 Ko Kyung-min – coordinator
 Lee Ji-min – coordinator
 Jung Hae-ik – production
 Kim Kyung-wook – production

Release history

See also
 List of best-selling albums in South Korea

References

1996 debut albums
SM Entertainment albums
H.O.T. albums